Niu Chiao was an obscure Chinese writer and poet of the 9th century CE. Reputedly, he wrote more than 30 books on a variety of topics.

Some of his writings are collected in "Ling Kuai Lu" (about A.D. 879).

Chiao short story "The Story of the Foxes", also known as Wang-sen and his fox brother, appears on the anthology book The Book of Fantasy.

References

Further reading
"Some Aspects of the Conflicts of Religion in China during the Six Dynasties and T'ang Periods". E. Edwards. Bulletin of the School of Oriental Studies, University of London, Vol. 7, No. 4 (1935), pp. 799–808

External links
 The Story of the Foxes, full text in Chinese and English.

9th-century Chinese people